Kalev Tallinn is a multi-sport club in Tallinn, Estonia. The club was formed as Jalgpalliselts Meteor (Football Union Meteor) in 1909 and changed to its present name in 1911, when it joined the all-Estonian sports organisation Estonian Sports Association Kalev.

The club has teams in various sports.

Association football
The men's football team is called JK Tallinna Kalev and for the women's football team, see JK Tallinna Kalev (women).

Bandy
During its first years, Kalev Tallinn also was a successful club in the sport of bandy. The club became Estonian champions of this sport in 1916, 1917 and 1918.

Basketball
 KK Kalev (1920–2005)
 BC Tallinna Kalev (1998–)

Ice Hockey
Kalev used to play in the ice hockey Meistriliiga, winning the title seven times in 1934, 1937, 1958, 1959, 1960, 1961 and 1962.

Rugby 
The club is also playing rugby. The rugby team goes under the name Tallinna Kalev RFC.

References

Multi-sport clubs in Estonia
Bandy clubs in Estonia
Bandy clubs established in 1909